Aganang FM is a South African community radio station based in the North West.

Coverage areas 
Covers a 100 km radius that includes:
Potchefstroom
Klerksdorp
Ventersdorp
Orkney
Stilfontein
Merafong

Broadcast languages
Afrikaans
SeSotho
Tswana
North Sotho

Broadcast time
24/7

Target audience
LSM Groups 4 - 8
Age Group 14 - 60

Programme format
60% Talk
40% Music

Listenership Figures

References

External links
 Official Website
 SAARF Website

Community radio stations in South Africa
Mass media in North West (South African province)